Gertrude Mary Kinnaird (1853-1931) was an English philanthropist and Christian missionary. She was a member of Youth Women's Christian Association (YWCA).

Life 
Gertrude Kinnaird was born in 1853 to the 11th Baron Arthur Fitzgerald Kinnaird and Mary Jane née Hoare, philanthropist and founder of Young Women's Christian Association (YWCA).

Kinnaird was a missionary and a member of YWCA. She had a keen interest in affairs concerned with India. Kinnaird had a reputation of most capable and impressive platform speaker. She spoke at the meetings raising awareness about hundred millions of people in India who have not heard about Jesus Christ. She also spoke of the great need for advance in education and medical work among the women in India.

Kinnaird participated in various educational and reformist projects such as the Indian Female Normal School and Instruction Society and the Zenana Bible and Medical Mission, precursors of the present-day international Christian organization Interserve.

Gertrude Kinnaird died in July 1931. Her funeral took place at the Golders Green Crematorium in London on 14 July 1931.

References 

YWCA leaders
English philanthropists
Daughters of barons
19th-century British philanthropists
1853 births
1931 deaths
19th-century women philanthropists